The sack (abbreviation: sck.) was an English unit of weight or mass used for coal and wool. It has also been used for other commodities by weight, commodities by volume, and for both weight and volume in the United States.

Wool
The wool sack or woolsack ( or ) was standardized as 2 wey of 14 stone each, with each stone  merchants' pounds each (i.e. 350 merchants' pounds or about 153 kilograms), by the time of the Assize of Weights and Measures . 12 such sacks formed the wool last.

Coal
The coal sack was standardized as an imperial hundredweight of 112 avoirdupois pounds, approximately 51 kilograms.

Large sack

The large sack was a UK unit of weight for coal. It was introduced by the London, Westminster and Home Counties Coal Trade Act of 1831 (2 Will 4 c lxxvi), which required coal to be sold by weight rather than volume.

The Royal Navy used large sacks holding two hundredweight for coaling its ships.  These sacks were made of jute bound with Manila rope.  They were filled in the hold of a collier using a scoop and then a wire cable was run through two iron rings at the mouth of the sack to close and hoist it over to the warship, twelve sacks at a time.  A sack truck would then be used to take each sack to the chute of the warship's coal bunker where they would be emptied.   These sacks were large and heavy, weighing at least sixteen pounds when empty, and costing 11 shillings and sixpence before the First World War.

Definition
The large sack was defined as 224 pounds.

Conversion
1 large sack ≡ 2 sacks, equivalent to 2 cwt, 224 lb, or about 102 kg

Other uses
The sack has also been used as a unit of volume. In the American oil industry, a sack represents the amount of portland cement that occupies , and in most cases weighs .

In British usage, a sack of flour was equivalent to 20 stone,  or one-eighth of a long ton.

References

External links

 Tetbury woolsack race

Units of mass
Customary units of measurement